Ulviyya Fataliyeva (born 3 August 1996) is an Azerbaijani chess player who holds the title of International Master.

Biography
Ganja chess school alumni. Ulviyya Fataliyeva participated in Azerbaijani Girls' Championships and won this tournament in 2011 (age category U20). Also she participated in European Youth Chess Championships and World Youth Chess Championships. In 2010 in Batumi Ulviyya Fataliyeva won European Youth Chess Championship in Girls U14 age category. In 2014 she won European Youth Chess Championship in Girls U18 age category. In 2017 she won silver medal in Azerbaijani Women Chess Championship (tournament won Gunay Mammadzada), and won silver medal for Azerbaijan chess club Odlar Yurdu in team competition and individual silver medal in 22nd European Chess Club Cup for Women.

Ulviyya Fataliyeva played for Azerbaijan in the 42nd Chess Olympiad (women) in Baku (2016), World Women's Team Chess Championship in Khanty-Mansiysk (2017), and two European Women's Team Chess Championships (2015, 2017).

In August 2022 in Prague she won bronze medal in European Women's Individual Chess Championship.

In 2014, she was awarded the FIDE Woman International Master (WIM) title and received the FIDE Woman Grandmaster (WGM) title three year later.

References

External links

1996 births
Living people
Azerbaijani female chess players
Chess International Masters
Chess woman grandmasters